Maria Rachele “Mariele” Ventre (16 July 1939 – 16 December 1995) was an Italian musician and singer, the founder and director of Italian children's choir Piccolo Coro dell'Antoniano.

Biography 
Mariele Ventre was born in Bologna, Emilia-Romagna, from Lucanian immigrants.

She was nominated and rewarded with many awards for her work with and for children. She died in Bologna. Three weeks before her death, she directed the choir and young soloists at 38th Zecchino d'Oro international festival of songs for children. Now, the choir is directed by Sabrina Simoni, formerly Ventre's assistant.

Antonella Boriani and Gianmarco Gualandi dedicated a song to her, titled "Mariele chi è?" (Who is Mariele?) sung by the Piccolo Coro Mariele Ventre dell'Antoniano on 22 November 2005.

Notes

External links 
Unofficial Page
Foundation of Mariele Ventre
Official Homepage

1939 births
1995 deaths
Musicians from Bologna
People of Lucanian descent
Choirs of children
20th-century Italian women singers
Deaths from cancer in Emilia-Romagna
Deaths from breast cancer